Coral Club is an international company that distributes dietary supplements and health products. In 1998, the company started with the promotion of the flagship product Alka-Mine, which enhances the physiological properties of water. Products are manufactured in the USA, Canada, Germany, Armenia, Norway, France, Japan, Taiwan, South Korea and Russia. Today the company's branches are present in 35 countries, and the products are delivered to 175 countries.

History 
In 1998 the company opened its first office in Toronto, Canada.

In 1999 Erik Megrabyan partnered with Leonid Lapp and became a co-owner of Coral Club. Rolf Eriksson, the owner of Alka-Mine worldwide, transferred the exclusive rights to sell Coral-Mine (Alka-Mine) to Coral Club the same year.

In 1999 Royal Body Care, which in 1996 acquired Light Force, founded by Christopher Hills, became the partner of Coral Club.

In November 2000 Coral Club increased its market presence.

In 2008 despite the crisis, the turnover of the Coral Club continued to exhibit steady income growth compared to 2007. In the same year, the company's owners, Leonid Lapp and Erik Megrabyan, arranged the development of the products under their brand exclusively. Coral Club distributor partners increased by 25% in 2008.

In 2020 Coral Club owned 288 offline stores and delivered products to 175 countries. The product range includes more than 170 health, beauty, and home products made in the USA, Canada, Germany, Armenia, Norway, France, Japan, Taiwan, South Korea and Russia. 
The company also develops programs for maintaining a healthy body. Currently, the assortment includes 11 kits for holistic nutritional support and two programs.

In 2021–2022, Coral Club carried out three major online projects and created its own platform for online events. The total coverage of the company's digital projects amounted to about 3 million people.

Scientific research 
BION Institute, headed by Professor Igor Jerman, conducted a series of studies of Coral-Mine's effects on the properties of water. The studies established that Coral-Mine has a significant and enduring effect on the water resulting in the most biologically active form of water. The findings were published in January 2021 by Water Journal

The effect of coral club products on the reduction potential (ORP) of drinking water was studied by Goncharuk et al. It is shown that when water is treated with coral calcium, its ORP shifts into the negative region. This value corresponds to the optimal ORP values for intercellular fluids of body tissues.

Business Model 
Coral Club uses direct selling and network marketing with a multi-level compensation system as a business model and networking. Coral Club's marketing plan gives the possibility to be rewarded based on monthly turnover.

The company also operates an academy to improve the skills of partners.

Awards 
 2006 – mineral composition "ALKA-MINE" was awarded the Medal of Honor "For Contribution to the Nation's Health Strengthening," named after I. I. Mechnikov.
 2019 – vitamin and mineral complex of new generation Yummy Vits Orange by Coral Club received an international award, "The Innovative Product of the Year".

Owners and management 
Leonid Lapp is the President and founder of the company. 
Erik Megrabyan is the CEO of Coral Club. He became an associate of Leonid Lapp right after the company was launched.

References

External links 
 Official website

Retail companies established in 1998
Multi-level marketing companies
Privately held companies
Personal selling